Go Fly a Kit is a 1957 Warner Bros. Looney Tunes cartoon directed by Chuck Jones.  It was released on February 23, 1957. The title is a pun on the phrase "Go fly a kite."

Plot 
At an airport, a business man notices a red cat looking out over a fence, seeming to be anxiously waiting for something or someone. When he asks the steward, he's told the story of her boyfriend. As a kitten, he was adopted by a mother eagle. He quickly learned to fly and had to say goodbye to his mother like all eagles.

One day, he notices a bulldog chasing a female cat (the same cat from the beginning). He saves her from the dog, using his ability to fly. The cats fall in love with each other. The steward then wraps up by explaining that her boyfriend flies south every winter and every spring she goes to the airport and waits for him to come back. As the story finishes, her face suddenly lights up as he comes flying in. At the gate, he's greeted by his girlfriend and their litter of flying kittens.

Home media
Go Fly a Kit was released on Looney Tunes Golden Collection: Volume 4, Disc 4.

Note
Some people confuse Hector, who plays the antagonist, with Marc Antony. In other cartoons, Marc Antony is Pussyfoot's acting guardian.

References

External links
 

1957 films
1957 animated films
1957 short films
1950s Warner Bros. animated short films
Short films directed by Chuck Jones
Looney Tunes shorts
American aviation films
Films scored by Milt Franklyn
Animated films about cats
Animated films about dogs
Films with screenplays by Michael Maltese
Films produced by Edward Selzer
1950s English-language films
Films about adoption